Anneli Ahven (born 27 January 1972 in Tallinn) is an Estonian film producer.

From 1993 to 1999 she graduated from Estonian Institute of Humanities in germanistics. In 2002 she defended her master's thesis at Hamburg University. 
Since 1995 she is working for Exitfilm.

She has participated in production of over 30 films.

Filmography

 2015: "Must alpinist"
 2015: "Tiibadeta piloot"
 2016: "Õnn tuleb magades"
 2017: "Kolm päeva augustis"
 2019: "Johannes Pääsukese tõeline elu" 
 2021: "Sandra saab tööd"

References

Estonian film producers
Estonian women film producers
1972 births
Living people